Ulrik Yttergård Jenssen (born 4 December 1996) is a Norwegian professional footballer who plays as a centre-back for Danish Superliga club Nordsjælland.

Club career
Born in Tromsø, Jenssen is the son of former Tromsø and Sogndal manager Truls Jenssen. His older brother is the footballer Ruben Yttergård Jenssen. 

On 4 August 2016, Jenssen transferred from Lyon II to sign a three-and-a-half year with Tromsø.

After joining FC Nordsjælland in January 2018, Jensen left the club again in the summer 2021.

In July 2021, Jenssen signed a three-year contract with Eredivisie club Willem II. His contract was terminated by mutual consent on 20 June 2022, after the club had suffered relegation.

Jenssen returned to Nordsjælland on 19 August 2022, signing a contract until December 2022.

In November 2022, Jenssen signed for Rosenborg, joining the club from January 2023.

International career
In 2016, he was called up to the Norway national football team despite not having played a senior first-team match for any club.

Career statistics

References

External links

1996 births
Living people
Sportspeople from Tromsø
Norwegian footballers
Norway under-21 international footballers
Norway youth international footballers
Association football midfielders
Norwegian expatriate footballers
Expatriate footballers in France
Expatriate men's footballers in Denmark
Expatriate footballers in the Netherlands
Norwegian expatriate sportspeople in France
Norwegian expatriate sportspeople in Denmark
Norwegian expatriate sportspeople in the Netherlands
Tromsø IL players
FC Nordsjælland players
Willem II (football club) players
Championnat National 2 players
Eliteserien players
Danish Superliga players
Eredivisie players